Patrick F. Sullivan FRANZCP is an American psychiatric geneticist. He is the Yeargen Distinguished Professor of Psychiatry and Genetics at the University of North Carolina at Chapel Hill, where he is also the director of the Center for Psychiatric Genomics and the lead principal investigator of the Psychiatric Genomics Consortium. He is also a professor at the Karolinska Institutet in Stockholm, Sweden. His research focuses on the genetics of schizophrenia, major depressive disorders such as post-partum depression, eating disorders, and autism.

References

External links
Faculty page

Living people
University of North Carolina at Chapel Hill faculty
American geneticists
American psychiatrists
Academic staff of the Karolinska Institute
People from Saint Paul, Minnesota
University of Notre Dame alumni
University of California, San Francisco alumni
Psychiatric geneticists
Year of birth missing (living people)
Fellows of the American Association for the Advancement of Science